Demilune, demi-lune, or similar, may refer to:

 Semicircle shape
 A half-moon, the first quarter or last quarter lunar phase
 Ravelin, a type of fortification also called demi-lune
 Serous demilune (Demilunes of Heidenhain), the crescent shaped formations on salivary glands
 La Demi Lune, a card game also known as Crescent (solitaire)
 Demilune (Op.74), a composition by Alan Hovhaness; see List of compositions by Alan Hovhaness
 La Demi-Lune, Lannemezan, Hautes-Pyrénées, Occitanie, France; a neighbourhood
 Demi-Lune, La Demi-Lune, Lannemezan, Hautes-Pyrénées, Occitanie, France; a park

See also

 Tassin-la-Demi-Lune, Lyons, Auvergne-Rhône-Alpes, France

 Half Moon (disambiguation)
 Crescent (disambiguation)
 Demi (disambiguation)
 Lune (disambiguation)